The Charles A. Barber Farmstead is a historic farmstead outside Lily, South Dakota.  It consists of a complex of twelve buildings, including a house which was built in 1900 by the original homesteader, Charles Barber.  The house is a fairly typical American Foursquare structure, which reached its present configuration by enlargement in 1914.  Also included in the farmstead are an 1895 barn built by Berber, and several granaries moved to the property in the 1950s.

The property was listed on the National Register of Historic Places in 1988.  The listing was expanded in 1996 to include a granary built by Barber, which is located on what is now a separate property across the street.

References

Farms on the National Register of Historic Places in South Dakota
Buildings and structures completed in 1900
Day County, South Dakota
Historic districts on the National Register of Historic Places in South Dakota
National Register of Historic Places in Day County, South Dakota